Babacar Dione (born 22 March 1997) is a Belgian professional footballer who plays as a striker for Bulgarian First League club Lokomotiv Plovdiv.

Personal life
Born in Belgium, Dione is of Senegalelse descent.

References

External links
 
 

1997 births
Living people
Belgian footballers
Belgian people of Senegalese descent
Royal Excel Mouscron players
PFC Lokomotiv Plovdiv players
Belgian Pro League players
Association football forwards
People from Duffel
Footballers from Antwerp Province
Belgian expatriate footballers
Expatriate footballers in Bulgaria
Belgian expatriate sportspeople in Bulgaria